Johnny Midnight may refer to:

 Johnny Midnight (TV series), a 1960 American crime drama
 Johnny Midnight (broadcaster) (1941–2014), Filipino radio and television broadcaster